CTi International is a Taiwanese pay television channel operated by Chung T'ien Television directed towards the Chinese diaspora abroad. It is available in Southeast Asia, Australia, New Zealand and North America.

Feeds
CTi Asia: Available in Asia, it features programmes from CTi without including drama timeslots, from 2013 onwards it also launched in the Middle East and in Africa.
CTi North America: Available in North America (USA only), it includes drama timeslots.

External links
 CTi International official website

Television stations in Taiwan
Television channels and stations established in 1994
1994 establishments in Taiwan